Statistics of the Scottish Football League in season 1948–49.

Scottish League Division A

Scottish League Division B

Scottish League Division C

See also
1948–49 in Scottish football

References

 
Scottish Football League seasons